The 118th United States Congress is the current meeting of the legislative branch of the United States federal government, composed of the United States Senate and the United States House of Representatives. It convened in Washington, D.C., on January 3, 2023, and will continue until January 3, 2025, during the final two years of President Joe Biden's initial term.

With Republicans winning the House, the 118th Congress ended the federal government trifecta Democrats held in the 117th. 

This congress also features the first female Senate president pro tempore (Patty Murray), the first Black party leader (Hakeem Jeffries) in congressional history, and the longest serving Senate party leader (Mitch McConnell). Additionally, it began with a multi-ballot election for Speaker of the House, which had not happened since the 68th Congress in 1923. Kevin McCarthy was eventually elected speaker on the 15th ballot.

Major events 

 January 3, 2023, 12:00 p.m. EST: Congress convened. Members-elect of the United States Senate were sworn in, but members-elect of the United States House of Representatives could not be sworn as the House adjourned for the day without electing a speaker.

 January 3–7, 2023: The election for the House speakership took 15 ballots. Kevin McCarthy was ultimately elected as speaker, but only after six representatives-elect voted "present", lowering the threshold to be elected from 218 to 215.
 February 2, 2023: House voted 218–211 to remove Representative Ilhan Omar of Minnesota from the Committee on Foreign Affairs.
 February 7, 2023: President Joe Biden delivered the 2023 State of the Union Address.

Major legislation

Proposed (but not enacted) 

 House bills
: No Taxpayer Funding for Abortion and Abortion Insurance Full Disclosure Act of 2023
: Strategic Production Response Act (awaiting action in the Senate)
: Protecting America's Strategic Petroleum Reserve from China Act (awaiting action in the Senate)
: Family and Small Business Taxpayer Protection Act (awaiting action in the Senate)
: FairTax Act of 2023
: Born-Alive Abortion Survivors Protection Act (awaiting action in the Senate)
: Prosecutors Need to Prosecute Act
: Illegal Alien NICS Alert Act
: Border Safety and Security Act of 2023
: Washington, D.C., Admission Act
: Regulations from the Executive in Need of Scrutiny Act
 Senate bills
: A bill to repeal the authorizations for use of military force against Iraq.
: Covid-19 Origin Act of 2023 (awaiting President's signature)

Major resolutions

Adopted 
: Adopting the Rules of the House of Representatives for the One Hundred Eighteenth Congress, and for other purposes.
: Establishing the Select Committee on the Strategic Competition Between the United States and the Chinese Communist Party.
: Establishing a Select Subcommittee on the Weaponization of the Federal Government as a select investigative subcommittee of the Committee on the Judiciary.
: Removing Ilhan Omar from the House Foreign Affairs Committee.

Proposed 
: Impeaching Alejandro Nicholas Mayorkas, Secretary of Homeland Security.
: Expressing the sense of Congress condemning the recent attacks on pro-life facilities, groups, and churches. (awaiting action in the Senate)
: Expressing support for the Nation's law enforcement agencies and condemning any efforts to defund or dismantle law enforcement agencies.
: Denouncing the horrors of socialism. (awaiting action in the Senate)
: Disapproving the action of the District of Columbia Council in approving the Revised Criminal Code Act of 2022. (awaiting President's signature)

Passed, but vetoed 
: Providing for congressional disapproval under chapter 8 of title 5, United States Code, of the rule submitted by the Department of Labor relating to "Prudence and Loyalty in Selecting Plan Investments and Exercising Shareholder Rights".

Party summary 
 Resignations and new members are discussed in the "Changes in membership" section below.

Senate 
Senate membership

House of Representatives

Leadership 
Note: Democrats refer to themselves as a "Caucus"; Republicans refer to themselves as a "Conference".

Senate

Presiding 
 President: Kamala Harris (D)
 President pro tempore: Patty Murray (D)

Majority (Democratic) 
 Majority Leader/Chair of the Senate Democratic Caucus: Chuck Schumer (NY)
 Majority Whip: Dick Durbin (IL)
 Chair of the Democratic Policy & Communications Committee: Debbie Stabenow (MI)
 Chair of the Democratic Steering Committee: Amy Klobuchar (MN)
 Vice Chairs, Senate Democratic Caucus: Mark Warner (VA) & Elizabeth Warren (MA)
 Chair of the Democratic Outreach Committee: Bernie Sanders (VT)
 Secretary of the Senate Democratic Caucus: Tammy Baldwin (WI)
 Vice Chairs of the Democratic Policy & Communications Committee: Joe Manchin (WV) & Cory Booker (NJ)
 Chair of the Democratic Senatorial Campaign Committee: Gary Peters (MI)
 Vice Chair of the Democratic Steering Committee: Jeanne Shaheen (NH)
 Vice Chair of the Democratic Outreach Committee: Catherine Cortez Masto (NV)
 Deputy Secretary of the Senate Democratic Caucus: Brian Schatz (HI)
 Senate Democratic Chief Deputy Whip: Jeff Merkley (OR)
 Vice Chairs of the Democratic Senatorial Campaign Committee: Tina Smith (MN) & Alex Padilla (CA)

Minority (Republican) 
 Minority Leader: Mitch McConnell (KY)
 Minority Whip: John Thune (SD)

 Chairman of the Senate Republican Conference: John Barrasso (WY)
 Chairwoman of the Republican Policy Committee: Joni Ernst (IA)
 Vice Chair of the Senate Republican Conference: Shelley Moore Capito (WV)
 Chairman of the National Republican Senatorial Campaign Committee: Steve Daines (MT)
 Chair of the Senate Republican Steering Committee: Mike Lee (UT)

House of Representatives

Presiding 
 Speaker: Kevin McCarthy (R)

Majority (Republican) 
 Majority Leader: Steve Scalise
 Majority Whip: Tom Emmer
 Conference Chair: Elise Stefanik
 Conference Vice Chair: Mike Johnson
 Conference Secretary: Lisa McClain
 Campaign Committee Chairman: Richard Hudson

Minority (Democratic) 
 Minority Leader: Hakeem Jeffries
 Minority Whip: Katherine Clark
 Caucus Chairman: Pete Aguilar
 Caucus Vice Chairman: Ted Lieu
 Chair of the Democratic Congressional Campaign Committee: Suzan DelBene
 Assistant Democratic Leader: Jim Clyburn
 Chair of the Democratic Policy and Communications Committee: Joe Neguse
 Chair of the House Democratic Policy and Communications Committee: Veronica Escobar
 House Democratic Freshman Class Leadership Representative: Jasmine Crockett

Members

Senate 

The numbers refer to their Senate classes. All class 3 seats were contested in the November 2022 elections. In this Congress, class 3 means their term commenced in the current Congress, requiring re-election in 2028; class 1 means their term ends with this Congress, requiring re-election in 2024; and class 2 means their term began in the last Congress, requiring re-election in 2026.

Alabama 
 2. Tommy Tuberville (R)
 3. Katie Britt (R)

Alaska 
 2. Dan Sullivan (R)
 3. Lisa Murkowski (R)

Arizona 
 1. Kyrsten Sinema (I)
 3. Mark Kelly (D)

Arkansas 
 2. Tom Cotton (R)
 3. John Boozman (R)

California 
 1. Dianne Feinstein (D)
 3. Alex Padilla (D)

Colorado 
 2. John Hickenlooper (D)
 3. Michael Bennet (D)

Connecticut 
 1. Chris Murphy (D)
 3. Richard Blumenthal (D)

Delaware 
 1. Tom Carper (D)
 2. Chris Coons (D)

Florida 
 1. Rick Scott (R)
 3. Marco Rubio (R)

Georgia 
 2. Jon Ossoff (D)
 3. Raphael Warnock (D)

Hawaii 
 1. Mazie Hirono (D)
 3. Brian Schatz (D)

Idaho 
 2. Jim Risch (R)
 3. Mike Crapo (R)

Illinois 
 2. Dick Durbin (D)
 3. Tammy Duckworth (D)

Indiana 
 1. Mike Braun (R)
 3. Todd Young (R)

Iowa 
 2. Joni Ernst (R)
 3. Chuck Grassley (R)

Kansas 
 2. Roger Marshall (R)
 3. Jerry Moran (R)

Kentucky 
 2. Mitch McConnell (R)
 3. Rand Paul (R)

Louisiana 
 2. Bill Cassidy (R)
 3. John Kennedy (R)

Maine 
 1. Angus King (I)
 2. Susan Collins (R)

Maryland 
 1. Ben Cardin (D)
 3. Chris Van Hollen (D)

Massachusetts 
 1. Elizabeth Warren (D)
 2. Ed Markey (D)

Michigan 
 1. Debbie Stabenow (D)
 2. Gary Peters (D)

Minnesota 
 1. Amy Klobuchar (DFL)
 2. Tina Smith (DFL)

Mississippi 
 1. Roger Wicker (R)
 2. Cindy Hyde-Smith (R)

Missouri 
 1. Josh Hawley (R)
 3. Eric Schmitt (R)

Montana 
 1. Jon Tester (D)
 2. Steve Daines (R)

Nebraska 
 1. Deb Fischer (R)
 2. Ben Sasse (R) 
  Pete Ricketts (R)

Nevada 
 1. Jacky Rosen (D)
 3. Catherine Cortez Masto (D)

New Hampshire 
 2. Jeanne Shaheen (D)
 3. Maggie Hassan (D)

New Jersey 
 1. Bob Menendez (D)
 2. Cory Booker (D)

New Mexico 
 1. Martin Heinrich (D)
 2. Ben Ray Luján (D)

New York 
 1. Kirsten Gillibrand (D)
 3. Chuck Schumer (D)

North Carolina 
 2. Thom Tillis (R)
 3. Ted Budd (R)

North Dakota 
 1. Kevin Cramer (R)
 3. John Hoeven (R)

Ohio 
 1. Sherrod Brown (D)
 3. J. D. Vance (R)

Oklahoma 
 2. Markwayne Mullin (R)
 3. James Lankford (R)

Oregon 
 2. Jeff Merkley (D)
 3. Ron Wyden (D)

Pennsylvania 
 1. Bob Casey Jr. (D)
 3. John Fetterman (D)

Rhode Island 
 1. Sheldon Whitehouse (D)
 2. Jack Reed (D)

South Carolina 
 2. Lindsey Graham (R)
 3. Tim Scott (R)

South Dakota 
 2. Mike Rounds (R)
 3. John Thune (R)

Tennessee 
 1. Marsha Blackburn (R)
 2. Bill Hagerty (R)

Texas 
 1. Ted Cruz (R)
 2. John Cornyn (R)

Utah 
 1. Mitt Romney (R)
 3. Mike Lee (R)

Vermont 
 1. Bernie Sanders (I)
 3. Peter Welch (D)

Virginia 
 1. Tim Kaine (D)
 2. Mark Warner (D)

Washington 
 1. Maria Cantwell (D)
 3. Patty Murray (D)

West Virginia 
 1. Joe Manchin (D)
 2. Shelley Moore Capito (R)

Wisconsin 
 1. Tammy Baldwin (D)
 3. Ron Johnson (R)

Wyoming 
 1. John Barrasso (R)
 2. Cynthia Lummis (R)

House of Representatives 

All 435 seats were filled by election in November 2022. Additionally, six non-voting members were elected from the American territories and Washington, D.C.

The numbers refer to the congressional district of the given state in this Congress. Eight new congressional districts were created or re-created, while eight others were eliminated, as a result of the 2020 United States census.

Alabama 
 . Jerry Carl (R)
 . Barry Moore (R)
 . Mike Rogers (R)
 . Robert Aderholt (R)
 . Dale Strong (R)
 . Gary Palmer (R)
 . Terri Sewell (D)

Alaska 
 . Mary Peltola (D)

Arizona 
 . David Schweikert (R)
 . Eli Crane (R)
 . Ruben Gallego (D)
 . Greg Stanton (D)
 . Andy Biggs (R)
 . Juan Ciscomani (R)
 . Raúl Grijalva (D)
 . Debbie Lesko (R)
 . Paul Gosar (R)

Arkansas 
 . Rick Crawford (R)
 . French Hill (R)
 . Steve Womack (R)
 . Bruce Westerman (R)

California 
 . Doug LaMalfa (R)
 . Jared Huffman (D)
 . Kevin Kiley (R)
 . Mike Thompson (D)
 . Tom McClintock (R)
 . Ami Bera (D)
 . Doris Matsui (D)
 . John Garamendi (D)
 . Josh Harder (D)
 . Mark DeSaulnier (D)
 . Nancy Pelosi (D)
 . Barbara Lee (D)
 . John Duarte (R)
 . Eric Swalwell (D)
 . Kevin Mullin (D)
 . Anna Eshoo (D)
 . Ro Khanna (D)
 . Zoe Lofgren (D)
 . Jimmy Panetta (D)
 . Kevin McCarthy (R)
 . Jim Costa (D)
 . David Valadao (R)
 . Jay Obernolte (R)
 . Salud Carbajal (D)
 . Raul Ruiz (D)
 . Julia Brownley (D)
 . Mike Garcia (R)
 . Judy Chu (D)
 . Tony Cárdenas (D)
 . Adam Schiff (D)
 . Grace Napolitano (D)
 . Brad Sherman (D)
 . Pete Aguilar (D)
 . Jimmy Gomez (D)
 . Norma Torres (D)
 . Ted Lieu (D)
 . Sydney Kamlager-Dove (D)
 . Linda Sánchez (D)
 . Mark Takano (D)
 . Young Kim (R)
 . Ken Calvert (R)
 . Robert Garcia (D)
 . Maxine Waters (D)
 . Nanette Barragán (D)
 . Michelle Steel (R)
 . Lou Correa (D)
 . Katie Porter (D)
 . Darrell Issa (R)
 . Mike Levin (D)
 . Scott Peters (D)
 . Sara Jacobs (D)
 . Juan Vargas (D)

Colorado 
 . Diana DeGette (D)
 . Joe Neguse (D)
 . Lauren Boebert (R)
 . Ken Buck (R)
 . Doug Lamborn (R)
 . Jason Crow (D)
 . Brittany Pettersen (D)
 . Yadira Caraveo (D)

Connecticut 
 . John B. Larson (D)
 . Joe Courtney (D)
 . Rosa DeLauro (D)
 . Jim Himes (D)
 . Jahana Hayes (D)

Delaware 
 . Lisa Blunt Rochester (D)

Florida 
 . Matt Gaetz (R)
 . Neal Dunn (R)
 . Kat Cammack (R)
 . Aaron Bean (R)
 . John Rutherford (R)
 . Michael Waltz (R)
 . Cory Mills (R)
 . Bill Posey (R)
 . Darren Soto (D)
 . Maxwell Frost (D)
 . Daniel Webster (R)
 . Gus Bilirakis (R)
 . Anna Paulina Luna (R)
 . Kathy Castor (D)
 . Laurel Lee (R)
 . Vern Buchanan (R)
 . Greg Steube (R)
 . Scott Franklin (R)
 . Byron Donalds (R)
 . Sheila Cherfilus-McCormick (D)
 . Brian Mast (R)
 . Lois Frankel (D)
 . Jared Moskowitz (D)
 . Frederica Wilson (D)
 . Debbie Wasserman Schultz (D)
 . Mario Díaz-Balart (R)
 . María Elvira Salazar (R)
 . Carlos A. Giménez (R)

Georgia 
 . Buddy Carter (R)
 . Sanford Bishop (D)
 . Drew Ferguson (R)
 . Hank Johnson (D)
 . Nikema Williams (D)
 . Rich McCormick (R)
 . Lucy McBath (D)
 . Austin Scott (R)
 . Andrew Clyde (R)
 . Mike Collins (R)
 . Barry Loudermilk (R)
 . Rick Allen (R)
 . David Scott (D)
 . Marjorie Taylor Greene (R)

Hawaii 
 . Ed Case (D)
 . Jill Tokuda (D)

Idaho 
 . Russ Fulcher (R)
 . Mike Simpson (R)

Illinois 
 . Jonathan Jackson (D)
 . Robin Kelly (D)
 . Delia Ramirez (D)
 . Chuy García (D)
 . Mike Quigley (D)
 . Sean Casten (D)
 . Danny Davis (D)
 . Raja Krishnamoorthi (D)
 . Jan Schakowsky (D)
 . Brad Schneider (D)
 . Bill Foster (D)
 . Mike Bost (R)
 . Nikki Budzinski (D)
 . Lauren Underwood (D)
 . Mary Miller (R)
 . Darin LaHood (R)
 . Eric Sorensen (D)

Indiana 
 . Frank J. Mrvan (D)
 . Rudy Yakym (R)
 . Jim Banks (R)
 . Jim Baird (R)
 . Victoria Spartz (R)
 . Greg Pence (R)
 . André Carson (D)
 . Larry Bucshon (R)
 . Erin Houchin (R)

Iowa 
 . Mariannette Miller-Meeks (R)
 . Ashley Hinson (R)
 . Zach Nunn (R)
 . Randy Feenstra (R)

Kansas 
 . Tracey Mann (R)
 . Jake LaTurner (R)
 . Sharice Davids (D)
 . Ron Estes (R)

Kentucky 
 . James Comer (R)
 . Brett Guthrie (R)
 . Morgan McGarvey (D)
 . Thomas Massie (R)
 . Hal Rogers (R)
 . Andy Barr (R)

Louisiana 
 . Steve Scalise (R)
 . Troy Carter (D)
 . Clay Higgins (R)
 . Mike Johnson (R)
 . Julia Letlow (R)
 . Garret Graves (R)

Maine 
 . Chellie Pingree (D)
 . Jared Golden (D)

Maryland 
 . Andy Harris (R)
 . Dutch Ruppersberger (D)
 . John Sarbanes (D)
 . Glenn Ivey (D)
 . Steny Hoyer (D)
 . David Trone (D)
 . Kweisi Mfume (D)
 . Jamie Raskin (D)

Massachusetts 
 . Richard Neal (D)
 . Jim McGovern (D)
 . Lori Trahan (D)
 . Jake Auchincloss (D)
 . Katherine Clark (D)
 . Seth Moulton (D)
 . Ayanna Pressley (D)
 . Stephen Lynch (D)
 . Bill Keating (D)

Michigan 
 . Jack Bergman (R)
 . John Moolenaar (R)
 . Hillary Scholten (D)
 . Bill Huizenga (R)
 . Tim Walberg (R)
 . Debbie Dingell (D)
 . Elissa Slotkin (D)
 . Dan Kildee (D)
 . Lisa McClain (R)
 . John James (R)
 . Haley Stevens (D)
 . Rashida Tlaib (D)
 . Shri Thanedar (D)

Minnesota 
 . Brad Finstad (R)
 . Angie Craig (DFL)
 . Dean Phillips (DFL)
 . Betty McCollum (DFL)
 . Ilhan Omar (DFL)
 . Tom Emmer (R)
 . Michelle Fischbach (R)
 . Pete Stauber (R)

Mississippi 
 . Trent Kelly (R)
 . Bennie Thompson (D)
 . Michael Guest (R)
 . Mike Ezell (R)

Missouri 
 . Cori Bush (D)
 . Ann Wagner (R)
 . Blaine Luetkemeyer (R)
 . Mark Alford (R)
 . Emanuel Cleaver (D)
 . Sam Graves (R)
 . Eric Burlison (R)
 . Jason Smith (R)

Montana 
 . Ryan Zinke (R)
 . Matt Rosendale (R)

Nebraska 
 . Mike Flood (R)
 . Don Bacon (R)
 . Adrian Smith (R)

Nevada 
 . Dina Titus (D)
 . Mark Amodei (R)
 . Susie Lee (D)
 . Steven Horsford (D)

New Hampshire 
 . Chris Pappas (D)
 . Annie Kuster (D)

New Jersey 
 . Donald Norcross (D)
 . Jeff Van Drew (R)
 . Andy Kim (D)
 . Chris Smith (R)
 . Josh Gottheimer (D)
 . Frank Pallone (D)
 . Thomas Kean Jr. (R)
 . Rob Menendez (D)
 . Bill Pascrell (D)
 . Donald Payne Jr. (D)
 . Mikie Sherrill (D)
 . Bonnie Watson Coleman (D)

New Mexico 
 . Melanie Stansbury (D)
 . Gabe Vasquez (D)
 . Teresa Leger Fernandez (D)

New York 
 . Nick LaLota (R)
 . Andrew Garbarino (R)
 . George Santos (R)
 . Anthony D'Esposito (R)
 . Gregory Meeks (D)
 . Grace Meng (D)
 . Nydia Velázquez (D)
 . Hakeem Jeffries (D)
 . Yvette Clarke (D)
 . Dan Goldman (D)
 . Nicole Malliotakis (R)
 . Jerry Nadler (D)
 . Adriano Espaillat (D)
 . Alexandria Ocasio-Cortez (D)
 . Ritchie Torres (D)
 . Jamaal Bowman (D)
 . Mike Lawler (R)
 . Pat Ryan (D)
 . Marc Molinaro (R)
 . Paul Tonko (D)
 . Elise Stefanik (R)
 . Brandon Williams (R)
 . Nick Langworthy (R)
 . Claudia Tenney (R)
 . Joseph Morelle (D)
 . Brian Higgins (D)

North Carolina 
 . Don Davis (D)
 . Deborah K. Ross (D)
 . Greg Murphy (R)
 . Valerie Foushee (D)
 . Virginia Foxx (R)
 . Kathy Manning (D)
 . David Rouzer (R)
 . Dan Bishop (R)
 . Richard Hudson (R)
 . Patrick McHenry (R)
 . Chuck Edwards (R)
 . Alma Adams (D)
 . Wiley Nickel (D)
 . Jeff Jackson (D)

North Dakota 
 . Kelly Armstrong (R)

Ohio 
 . Greg Landsman (D)
 . Brad Wenstrup (R)
 . Joyce Beatty (D)
 . Jim Jordan (R)
 . Bob Latta (R)
 . Bill Johnson (R)
 . Max Miller (R)
 . Warren Davidson (R)
 . Marcy Kaptur (D)
 . Mike Turner (R)
 . Shontel Brown (D)
 . Troy Balderson (R)
 . Emilia Sykes (D)
 . David Joyce (R)
 . Mike Carey (R)

Oklahoma 
 . Kevin Hern (R)
 . Josh Brecheen (R)
 . Frank Lucas (R)
 . Tom Cole (R)
 . Stephanie Bice (R)

Oregon 
 . Suzanne Bonamici (D)
 . Cliff Bentz (R)
 . Earl Blumenauer (D)
 . Val Hoyle (D)
 . Lori Chavez-DeRemer (R)
 . Andrea Salinas (D)

Pennsylvania 
 . Brian Fitzpatrick (R)
 . Brendan Boyle (D)
 . Dwight Evans (D)
 . Madeleine Dean (D)
 . Mary Gay Scanlon (D)
 . Chrissy Houlahan (D)
 . Susan Wild (D)
 . Matt Cartwright (D)
 . Dan Meuser (R)
 . Scott Perry (R)
 . Lloyd Smucker (R)
 . Summer Lee (D)
 . John Joyce (R)
 . Guy Reschenthaler (R)
 . Glenn Thompson (R)
 . Mike Kelly (R)
 . Chris Deluzio (D)

Rhode Island 
 . David Cicilline (D) 
 Vacant
 . Seth Magaziner (D)

South Carolina 
 . Nancy Mace  (R)
 . Joe Wilson (R)
 . Jeff Duncan (R)
 . William Timmons (R)
 . Ralph Norman (R)
 . Jim Clyburn (D)
 . Russell Fry (R)

South Dakota 
 . Dusty Johnson (R)

Tennessee 
 . Diana Harshbarger (R)
 . Tim Burchett (R)
 . Chuck Fleischmann (R)
 . Scott DesJarlais (R)
 . Andy Ogles (R)
 . John Rose (R)
 . Mark Green (R)
 . David Kustoff (R)
 . Steve Cohen (D)

Texas 
 . Nathaniel Moran (R)
 . Dan Crenshaw (R)
 . Keith Self (R)
 . Pat Fallon (R)
 . Lance Gooden (R)
 . Jake Ellzey (R)
 . Lizzie Fletcher (D)
 . Morgan Luttrell (R)
 . Al Green (D)
 . Michael McCaul (R)
 . August Pfluger (R)
 . Kay Granger (R)
 . Ronny Jackson (R)
 . Randy Weber (R)
 . Monica De La Cruz (R)
 . Veronica Escobar (D)
 . Pete Sessions (R)
 . Sheila Jackson Lee (D)
 . Jodey Arrington (R)
 . Joaquin Castro (D)
 . Chip Roy (R)
 . Troy Nehls (R)
 . Tony Gonzales (R)
 . Beth Van Duyne (R)
 . Roger Williams (R)
 . Michael C. Burgess (R)
 . Michael Cloud (R)
 . Henry Cuellar (D)
 . Sylvia Garcia (D)
 . Jasmine Crockett (D)
 . John Carter (R)
 . Colin Allred (D)
 . Marc Veasey (D)
 . Vicente Gonzalez (D)
 . Greg Casar (D)
 . Brian Babin (R)
 . Lloyd Doggett (D)
 . Wesley Hunt (R)

Utah 
 . Blake Moore (R)
 . Chris Stewart (R)
 . John Curtis (R)
 . Burgess Owens (R)

Vermont 
 . Becca Balint (D)

Virginia 
 . Rob Wittman (R)
 . Jen Kiggans (R)
 . Bobby Scott (D)
 . Jennifer McClellan (D) 
 . Bob Good (R)
 . Ben Cline (R)
 . Abigail Spanberger (D)
 . Don Beyer (D)
 . Morgan Griffith (R)
 . Jennifer Wexton (D)
 . Gerry Connolly (D)

Washington 
 . Suzan DelBene (D)
 . Rick Larsen (D)
 . Marie Gluesenkamp Perez (D)
 . Dan Newhouse (R)
 . Cathy McMorris Rodgers (R)
 . Derek Kilmer (D)
 . Pramila Jayapal (D)
 . Kim Schrier (D)
 . Adam Smith (D)
 . Marilyn Strickland (D)

West Virginia 
 . Carol Miller (R)
 . Alex Mooney (R)

Wisconsin 
 . Bryan Steil (R)
 . Mark Pocan (D)
 . Derrick Van Orden (R)
 . Gwen Moore (D)
 . Scott L. Fitzgerald (R)
 . Glenn Grothman (R)
 . Tom Tiffany (R)
 . Mike Gallagher (R)

Wyoming 
 . Harriet Hageman (R)

Non-voting members 
 : Amata Coleman Radewagen (R)
 : Eleanor Holmes Norton (D)
 : James Moylan (R)
 : Gregorio Sablan (D)
 : Jenniffer González (R-PNP)
 : Stacey Plaskett (D)

Changes in membership

Senate changes 

|-
! Nebraska(2)
|  | (R)
| data-sort-value="January 2023" | Incumbent resigned January 8, 2023, to become the president of the University of Florida.Successor was appointed January 12, 2023.
|  | (R)
| align=center | January 23, 2023
|-
|}

House of Representatives changes 

|-
! 
| data-sort-value="Aaaaa" | Vacant
| data-sort-value="January 3, 2023" | Incumbent Donald McEachin (D) died November 28, 2022, before the beginning of this Congress. A special election was held on February 21, 2023.
| |Jennifer McClellan(D)
| March 7, 2023
|-
! 
|  | (D)
| data-sort-value="June 1, 2023" | Incumbent will resign by June 1, 2023, to become CEO of the Rhode Island Foundation.A special election will be held on a date to be determined by Governor Dan McKee.
| colspan=2 align=center |TBD
|}

Committees 
Section contents: Senate, House, Joint

Senate Committees

Standing Committees

Select, Permanent Select & Special Committees

House of Representatives committees

Joint committees

Officers and officials

Congressional officers 

 Architect of the Capitol: Brett Blanton (Until February 23rd, 2023)
 Attending Physician: Brian P. Monahan

Senate officers 

 Chaplain: Barry Black (Seventh-day Adventist)
 Curator: Melinda Smith
 Historian: Betty Koed
 Librarian: Leona I. Faust
 Parliamentarian: Elizabeth MacDonough
 Secretary: Sonceria Berry
 Sergeant at Arms and Doorkeeper:  Karen Gibson

House of Representatives officers 

 Chaplain: Margaret G. Kibben (Presbyterian)
 Chief Administrative Officer: Catherine Szpindor
 Clerk: Cheryl Johnson
 Historian: Matthew Wasniewski
 Parliamentarian: Jason Smith
 Reading Clerks: Tylease Alli (D) and Susan Cole (R)
 Sergeant at Arms: William McFarland

See also 
 List of new members of the 118th United States Congress
 2022 United States elections (elections leading to this Congress)
 2022 United States Senate elections
 2022 United States House of Representatives elections
 2024 United States elections (elections during this Congress, leading to the next Congress)
 2024 United States Senate elections
 2024 United States House of Representatives elections

Notes

References